"Pushing 20" is a song recorded by American singer Sabrina Carpenter from her fourth studio album Singular: Act II and released as the lead single from the album. The track was written by Carpenter, Paul Guy Shelton II and its producer Warren "Oak" Felder. The song was released by Hollywood Records as the lead single from Singular: Act II on March 8, 2019. The song  is a hip hop and trap-influenced song with a "distinct pop sound". Lyrically, it talks about Carpenter wanting to deal with her own responsibilities instead of other people's opinions.

Background and release 
When Carpenter first performed the song on the Singular Tour in Orlando, Florida, she said to the audience: "I wrote this song 'cause I was at a time in my life, by the way, like, six weeks ago? Like, not even that crazy long ago. But it was at a time in my life where, you know, I think a lot of you in this crowd, no matter what age you are, are going to go through that period in your life where you start making choices and having a lot more responsibility. And then you have to, like, think before you speak and think about the repercussions of things. And there's just a lot on your plate and it becomes very heavy and there becomes, like, one day where you start listening to yourself before you listen to the opinions of other people".

On March 6, 2019, Carpenter posted a video on her social media saying "3/7/19 9pm pst" indicating she had an announcement to make. The song was released on March 6, 2019 at 12:00 am local time in every country.

The song was written in October 2018 by Sabrina Carpenter, Warren "Oak" Felder and Paul Guy Shelton II. It was produced and engineered by Felder at SuCasa Recording in Los Angeles with Keith "Daquan" Sorrells serving as an assistant engineer. The song was mixed by Eric J Dubowsky at Hercules St. Studios in Sydney. The song was mastered at Sterling Sound in New York City by Chris Gehringer with Will Quinnell serving as an assistant.

Live performances 
The song was eighth to be performed on the Singular Tour.

Credits and personnel
Recording and management
Recorded at SuCasa Recording (Los Angeles, California)
Mixed at Hercules St. Studios (Sydney, Australia)
Mastered at Sterling Sound (New York City)
Seven Summits Music (BMI) obo Itself and Pink Mic Music (BMI), Crow’s Tree Publishing (BMI) admin by Sony/ATV Songs LLC (BMI), BMG Gold Songs/KIDBROTHERMEDIA (ASCAP)

Personnel

Sabrina Carpenter – lead vocals, songwriting
Warren "Oak" Felder – songwriting, production , engineering
Paul Guy Shelton II – songwriting
Keith "Daquan" Sorrells – assistant engineering
Eric J. Dubowsky – mixing
Chris Gehringer – mastering
Will Quinnell  – assistant

Credits adapted from Singular: Act II liner notes.

Release history

References 

Sabrina Carpenter songs
2019 singles
Songs written by Sabrina Carpenter
Songs written by Oak Felder
2019 songs